"Honey Love" is a 1954 song by The Drifters featuring Clyde McPhatter. With influences taken from calypso music, "Honey Love" was the group's third single release, fourth release on the charts and second number one single on the R&B chart.

Song Background
Soon after release, the song was targeted by police in Memphis, confiscating copies of the record before they could be loaded into local jukeboxes due to their objection to what they described as 'suggestive lyrics' in the song.

See also
List of number-one rhythm and blues hits (United States)

References

The Drifters songs
1954 singles
Atlantic Records singles
Songs written by Jerry Wexler
1954 songs